Karosa B 932 is an urban bus produced by bus manufacturer Karosa from the Czech Republic, in the years of 1996 to 2002. Modernised version B932E was introduced in 1999. It was succeeded by Karosa B 952 in 2002.

Construction features 
Karosa B 932 is a model of the Karosa 900 series. The B 932 is derived from the Karosa B 732 city bus, and also unified with city bus models such as the B 941 and the B 931. The body is semi-self-supporting with frame and engine with manual gearbox in the rear part. The engine drives only the rear axle. The front axle is independent, rear axle is solid. All axles are mounted on air suspension. On the right side are three doors (first are narrower than middle doors). Inside are used plastic Vogelsitze or Fainsa seats. The driver's cab is separated from the rest of the vehicle by a glazed partition. In the middle part is room for a pram or wheelchair.

Production and operation 
In 1996 started serial production, which continued until 2002. Since 1999 were buses produced only in modernised version B 932 E, which has new solid front axle Škoda-LIAZ, floor lowered in front part by 10 centimeters, ABS and ASR.

Currently, number of Karosa B932 buses is decreasing, due to supply of new low-floor buses, for example by SOR NB 12 and SOR NS 12 made in Czech Republic and Iveco Urbanway 12m made in France.

Historical vehicles 
 private collector (rebuilt to CNG, from Jablonec nad Nisou, later FTL Prostějov, SPZ 1M3 2984, operating)

See also 

 List of buses

Buses manufactured by Karosa
Buses of the Czech Republic